The Kirati people, also spelled as Kirant or Kiranti, are a Sino-Tibetan ethnic group. They are peoples of the Himalayas, mostly the Eastern Himalaya extending eastward from Nepal to North East India (predominantly in the Indian state of Sikkim and the northern hilly regions of West Bengal, that is, Darjeeling and Kalimpong districts).

Etymology

Kirat means lion-hearted people or people of a lion nature. It also means mountain people.The word Kirata is a derivation from Kirati or Kiranti to name the group of people in Eastern Nepal and Northeast India.

History
 

The Kirat ("Kiranti") are an ancient people who have been associated with the history of Nepal for thousands of years. Sources from the Kathmandu Valley describe the Kiratas as early rulers there whom may have been cattle-herding tribes. During the Kirat Dynasty Kathmandu was called Yela-khom. According to one of the legendary accounts, the primitive kiratis living in Nepal also lived in Sikkim. They are descendents of one of the Primitive tribes. the Kiratis came out of the shackles of primitive living and slowly and gradually marched towards civilization This Kirati tribes, as stated earlier inhabited Sikkim. Dr. A. C. Singh (1983) stated that "Sikkim is known as the home of the Kirati tribesmen from the pre-historic times".

Modern scholarship
Contemporary historians widely agree that widespread cultural exchange and intermarriage took place in the eastern Himalayan region between the indigenous inhabitants — called the Kirat — and the Tibetan migrant population, reaching a climax during the 8th and 9th centuries.

Another wave of political and cultural conflict between Khas and Kirat ideals surfaced in the Kirat region of present-day Nepal during the last quarter of the 18th century. A collection of manuscripts from the 18th and 19th centuries, till now unpublished and unstudied by historians, have made possible a new understanding of this conflict. These historical sources are among those collected by Brian Houghton Hodgson (a British diplomat and self-trained orientalist appointed to the Kathmandu court during the second quarter of the 19th century) and his principal research aide, the scholar Khardar Jitmohan.

For over two millennia, a large portion of the eastern Himalaya was identified as the home of the Kirat people, of which the majority are known today as Limbu people, Rai, Sunuwar, and Yakkha. In ancient times, the entire Himalayan region was known as the Kimpurusha Desha Kimpurusha Kingdom (also, Kirata Pradesh).

For over a millennium, the Kirat had inhabited the Kathmandu Valley, where they installed their own ruling dynasty. According to the history of Nepal, the Kirats ruled for about 1,225 years (800 BC–300 AD). Their reign had 29 kings. The Kirat population in the valley and the original Australoids and Austro-Asiatic speakers form the base for what had developed into today's Newar population. As time passed, other Kirat groups, now known as Limbu, Rai,  Yakkha and Sunuwar settled mostly in the Koshi region of present-day Sikkim, Darjeeling and eastern Nepal. The Limbu people have their own distinct form of Kirat Mundhum, known as Yuma Sammang or Yumaism; they venerate a mythological goddess called Tagera Ningwaphumang.

In addition to ancestor worship, Kirati people also worship Mother Nature.

From around the 8th century, areas on the northern frontier of the Kirat region began to fall under the domination of migrant people of Tibetan origin. This flux of migration brought about the domination by Tibetan religious and cultural practices over ancient Kirat traditions. This influence first introduced shamanistic Bön practices, which in turn were later replaced by the oldest form of Tibetan Buddhism. The early influx of Bön culture to the peripheral Himalayan regions occurred only after the advent of Nyingma, the oldest Buddhist order in Lhasa and Central Tibet, which led followers of the older religion to flee to the Kirat area for survival. The Tibetan cultural influx ultimately laid the foundation for a Tibetan politico-religious order in the Kirat regions, and this led to the emergence of two major Tibetan Buddhist dynasties, one in Sikkim and another in Bhutan. The early political order of the Kingdom of Bhutan Hadgaon been established under the political and spiritual leadership of the lama Zhabs-drung Ngawang Namgyal.

Te-ongsi Sirijunga Xin Thebe

Te-ongsi Sirijunga Xin Thebe  was an 18th-century Limbu scholar, teacher, educator, historian, and philosopher of Limbuwan (pallo kirat)  and Sikkim. Sirijanga researched and taught the Limbu script, Limbu language and religion of the Limbus in various part of Limbuwan (Pallo Kirat) and Sikkim. He revived the old Limbu script developed in the 9th century.

History of Limbuwan: Kirat people of Limbu nationality
Limbuwan had a distinct history and political establishment until its unification with the kingdom of Gorkha in 1774 AD. During King Prithvi Narayan Shah's unification of Nepal, the present-day Nepal east of Arun and west of Mechi rivers was known as Limbuwan (pallo kirat). It was divided into 10 Limbu kingdoms; Morang kingdom was the most powerful and had a central government. The capital of Morang kingdom was Bijaypur (present-day Dharan). After the Limbuwan–Gorkha war and seeing the threat of the rising power of the British East India Company, the kings and ministers of all the some Yakthung laje ("thibong Yakthung laje") kingdoms of Limbuwan gathered in Bijaypur, and they agreed upon the Limbuwan-Gorkha Treaty ("Nun-Pani Sandhi"). This treaty formally merged the 10 Limbu kingdoms into the Gorkha kingdom but it also had a provision for autonomy of Limbuwan under the "kipat" system.

Kiratology
Kiratology is the study of Kirats the Mundhum along with history, cultures, languages and literatures of Kirat ethnic people in Nepal, Darjeeling, Sikkim, Assam, Myanmar, and so on. The Mundum or Mundhum is the book of knowledge on origin, history, culture, occupation and traditions of Kirati people. Noted scholars on Kiratology so far is Iman Xin Chemjong  who did ground breaking contributions on kirat Mundum/Mundhum, history, cultures, and languages. After Chemjong, PS Muringla, BB Muringla and Bairagi Kainla also contributed towards Kiratology.

Gorkhali hegemony
After the completion of the conquest of the Majha Kirat (Khambuwan / Rai peoples kingdom ) and Wallo Kirat (Sunuwar peoples Kingdom), the Gorkhali army marched east towards the Pallo Kirat (Limbuwan ) territory. The Limbu rulers of Limbuwan had established a weak rule in the Limbuwan region by adopting a policy of mutual understanding with the local yakthung leaders.

After the end of Rana Regime in 2007 BS (1951 AD), when power came back to Shah dynasty the autonomous power given to Limbu Kings was reduced. When King Mahendra ascended the throne he banished the law which prohibits other tribes right to buy land without permission of Subba  (Head of Limbu) of particular area as well as levy and taxes to Subba in 1979.

32 Kirat Kings who ruled in Kathmandu Valley
According to chronicle of Bansawali William Kirk Patrick and Daniel Wright, the Kirata kings of the Nepal Valley were:
King Shree Yalambar 90years/ राजा श्री यलम्बर - ९० वर्ष
King Shree Palamba - 81years/राजा श्री पलाम्बा- ८१ वर्ष
King Shree Melam - 89 years/राजा श्री मेलं - ८९ वर्ष
King Shree Changming - 42 years/राजा श्री चंमिं - ४२ वर्ष
King Shree Dhakang - 37 years/राजा श्री धस्कं - ३७ वर्ष
King Shree Walangcha - 31 years 6 months/राजा श्री वलंच - ३१ वर्ष ६ महिना
King Shree Jite Dasti - 40 years 8 months/राजा श्री जिते दस्ति - ४० वर्ष ८ mahina
King Shree Hoorma - 50 years/राजा श्री हुरमा - ५० वर्ष
King Shree Tooske - 41 years 8 months/राजा श्री तुस्के - ४१ वर्ष ८ महिना
King Shree Prasaphung - 38 years 6 months/राजा श्री प्रसफुं - ३८ वर्ष ६ महिना
King Shree Pawa: - 46 years/राजा श्री पवः - ४६ वर्ष
King Shree Daasti - 40 years/राजा श्री दास्ती - ४० वर्ष
King Shree Chamba - 71 years/राजा श्री चम्ब - ७१ वर्ष
King Shree Stungko - 54 years/राजा श्री स्तुङको - ५४ वर्ष
King Shree Swananda - 40 years 6 months/राजा श्री स्वनन्द - ४० वर्ष ६ महिना
King Shree Phukong - 58 years/राजा श्री फुकों - ५८ वर्ष
King Shree Singhu - 49 years 6 months/राजा श्री शिंघु - ४९ वर्ष ६ महिना
King Shree Joolam - 73 years 3 months/राजा श्री जुलम् - ७३ वर्ष ३ महिना
King Shree Lukan - 40 years/राजा श्री लुकं - ४० वर्ष
King Shree Thoram - 71 years/राजा श्री थोरम् - ७१ वर्ष
King Shree Angsu Barmma - 73 years 6 months/राजा श्री अंशु वर्म्म - ७३ वर्ष ६ महिना
King Shree Thuko - 83 years/राजा श्री थुको - ८३ वर्ष
King Shree Gunjong - 72 years 7 months/राजा श्री गुंजं ७२ वर्ष ७ महिना
King Shree Pushka - 81 years/राजा श्री पुस्क - ८१ वर्ष
King Shree Tyapamee - 54 years/राजा श्री त्यपमि - ५४ वर्ष
King Shree Moogmam - 58 years/राजा श्री मुगमम् - ५८ वर्ष
 King Shree Shasaru - 63 years/राजा श्री शसरू - ६३ वर्ष
King Shree Goongoong - 74 years/राजा श्री गंणं - ७४ वर्ष
King Shree Khimbung - 76 years/राजा श्री खिम्बुं - ७६ वर्ष
King Shree Girijung - 81 years/राजा श्री गिरीजं - ८१ वर्ष
King Shree Khurangja - 78 years/राजा श्री खुरांज - ७८ वर्ष
King Shree Khigu - 85 years/राजा श्री खिगु - ८५ वर्ष

The Yele Sambat (Yele Era) is named after Kirat King Yalambar. 32 Kirat Kings ruled in the Kathmandu valley for 1963 years 8 months. The Lichhavi dynasty dethroned the Kirat rulers in 158 AD (evidence: statue of Jaya Barma found in Maligaun of Kathmandu). This means that Kirat King Yalambar's reign started BC 1779.8. If we calculate current 2018 + 1779.8 = 3797 is the Kirati new year in Maghe Sakranti in 2018 AD. New year is celebrated in Maghe Sakranti which is around mid-January (January 14–15).

Modern ethnic groups 
The Kirati Population in Nepal number approximately one million (around five percent of the Nepalese population) and speak languages belonging to Tibeto-Burman. Kirant culture is clearly different from the Tibetan and Indo-Nepalese ones, although it has been influenced by them through long term contacts. According to census of 2011, the population of the Kirat peoples, are as following:

In academic literature, the earliest recorded groups of the Kirati are today divided into five groups — the Yakkha, Limbu, Rai, Sunuwar , Dhimal When the Shah kings conquered, they established the headman and as local rulers and were given the title Yakkha as Dewan,  Khambu as Rai, Limbu as Subba, Sunuwar as Mukhiya.

The Kirat groups that today identify themselves using the nomenclature 'Kirat' include the Khambu (Rai), Limbu (Subba), Sunuwar (Mukhia), Yakkha (Dewan), Thami (Thangmi) and few segments of the Kirat people like Bahing, Kulung and speakers of Khaling, Bantawa, Chamling, Thulung, Jerung, and other related ethnic groups. The tripartition of the Kirat region in Eastern Nepal documented by Hodgson, divided into three region are Wallo Kirat (Near Kirat), Majh Kirat ( Middle Kirat/ Khambuwan ) and Pallo Kirat (Far Kirat/ Limbuwan). The region Wallo Kirat, Majh Kirat were predominant by Khambu Kirat and Pallo Kirat were preponderance by Limbu Kirat as known as Limbuwan. The Yakkha, Khambu Rai, Limbu, and Sunuwar are different from one another and yet they all sit under one umbrella in many respects.

The Kirati people and Kiranti languages between the rivers Likhu and Arun, including some small groups east of the Arun, are usually referred to as the Kirat people, which is a geographic grouping rather than a genetic grouping. The Sunuwars inhabit the region westward of River Sun Koshi.

Other groups who claim descent from Kirat 
The Kirat were among the earliest inhabitants of the Kathmandu Valley and a large percentage of the Newar population is believed to have descended from them. The continuity of Newar society from the Kirat King Yalambar (Aakash Bhairav)  and pre-Licchavi period has been discussed by many historians and anthropologists. The language of the Newars, Nepalbhasa, a Sino-Tibetan language, is classified as a Kirati language. Similarly, the over 200 non-Sanskritic place names found in the Sanskrit inscriptions of the Licchavi period of the first millennium C.E. are acknowledged to belong to the proto-Newar language; modern variants of many of these words are still used by the Newars today to refer to geographical locations in and around Kathmandu valley. Although the 14th century text Gopalarajavamsavali states that the descendants of the Kirata clan that ruled Nepal before the Licchavis resided in the region of the Tamarkoshi river, a number of Newar caste and sub-caste groups and clans also claim descent from the erstwhile Kirat royal lineage.

Even though most modern Newars are either Hindu or Buddhist or a mixture of the two as a result of at least two millennia of Sanskritization and practice a complicated, ritualistic religious life, vestigal non-Sanskritic elements can be seen in some of their practices that have similarities with the cultures of other Mongoloid groups in the north-east region of India. Sudarshan Tiwari of Institute of Engineering, Tribhuvan University, in his essay "The Temples of the Kirata Nepal" argues that the Newar temple technology based on brick and timber usage and the rectangular temple design used for 'Tantric' Aju and Ajima deities are pre-Licchavi in origin and reflect Newar religious values and geometrical aesthetics from the Kirati period.

Religion

The Himalayan Kirat people practice Kirat Mundhum, calling it "Kirat religion". In early Kirat society, Mundhum was the only law of state. Kirati people worship nature and their ancestors, and practice shamanism through Nakchhong.

Major ethnic/caste groups following Kirat Religion in Nepal 2011 Census

 Some Kirat Limbus people believe in a mythological god called Tagera Ningwaphuma, a shapeless entity that appears as a bright light, and is worshipped in earthy form as the goddess Yuma Sammang and her male counterpart 'Theba Sammang'.

The Kirat Limbu ancestor Yuma Sammang and god of war Theba Sammang are the second most important deities. The Limbus festivals are Chasok Tangnam (Harvest Festival and worship of goddess Yuma), Yokwa (Worship of Ancestors), Limbu New Year's Day (Maghey Sankranti), Ke Lang, Limbu Cultural Day, Sirijanga Birthday Anniversary. Kirat Rai worship (Sumnima/Paruhang) are their cultural and religious practices. The names of some of their festivals are Sakela, Sakle, Tashi, Sakewa, Saleladi Bhunmidev, and Folsyandar. They have two main festivals: Sakela/Sakewa Ubhauli during planting season and Sakela/Sakewa Udhauli during the harvest.

Brigade of Gurkhas 
The British had recruited Gurkhas ethnicity-wise; four regiments were composed of Kirati tribes: Yakkha, Limbu, Rai, Sunuwar. The 7th Gurkha Rifles was raised in 1902 and recruited Rai, Limbu, Yakkha, and Sunuwar from Eastern Nepal. The 10th Gurkha Rifles and the regiment maintained its assigned recruiting areas in the kirat tribal areas of eastern Nepal as part of a broad reorganisation on 13 September 1901. 11 Gorkha Rifles composed entirely of kirati non-optees for the British Gorkhas.

Popular culture 
On 16 November 2014, French multinational video game developer company Ubisoft launched the game Far Cry 4. This game is plotted in the fictional mountainous country of Kyrat, which is heavily inspired by the Kirati people and culture.

See also 

 Kirata, Sanskrit term for various ancient and mythical Himalayan peoples
 Khuwalung, a rock in Koshi river sacred to Kirati people
Kirata Kingdom, mythological kingdom mentioned in the Mahabharata
 Banjhakri and Banjhakrini, legendary Kirati figures
 Kirateshwar Mahadev Temple
 Kirat Autonomous State
 Rai people
 Limbu people or the Yakthung
 Kirat Rai Yayokkha, an organization of the Rai people
 Kirat Yakthung Chumlung, an organization of the Limbu people

References

External links

 

‌

Himalayan peoples
Sino-Tibetan-speaking people
Indigenous peoples of Nepal
Ethnic groups in India
Ethnic groups in Northeast India
Kiranti
Old Royal Families of Nepal